Diuris tricolor, commonly known as the long-tailed donkey orchid or pine donkey orchid, is a species of orchid that is endemic to New South Wales, although a single plant has been found in Victoria. It has up to three grass-like leaves and up to six orange-coloured to yellow flowers with white and purplish tints. The lateral sepals are unusually long.

Description
Flowering occurs from September to November.

Taxonomy and naming
Diuris tricolor was first formally described in 1885 by Robert FitzGerald and the description was published in the Journal of Botany, British and Foreign. The specific epithet (tricolor) is derived from the Latin prefix tri- meaning "three", and color meaning "hue", "tint" or "complexion".

In 1940, Herman Rupp described D. colemaniae in honour of Edith Coleman and which he noted had shorter lateral sepals and a "quite different" labellum. Diuris colemaniae is now regarded as a synonym of D. tricolor.

Distribution
The long-tailed donkey orchid grows in grassland and forest in New South Wales, sporadically distributed south from Deepwater and in the Australian Capital Territory. A single specimen has been recorded in Victoria, just south of the border.

Conservation
Diuris tricolor is classed as Vulnerable in New South Wales under the Biodiversity Conservation Act 2016. The main threats to the species are habitat alteration and grazing by rabbits and goats.

References

tricolor
Endemic orchids of Australia
Orchids of New South Wales
Orchids of Victoria (Australia)
Plants described in 1885